Sunpat is a Garhwali film created in Garhwali, a language from Uttarakhand. The film is directed by Rahul Rawat. The film is also the first film from Uttarakhand to be screened at the International Film Festival of India . It was selected under the panorama section for the 52nd International Film Festival of India held at Goa. .

References

External links 

 

Garhwali-language films